The Eliphas Buffett House is a historic house located at 159 West Rogues Path in Cold Spring Harbor, Suffolk County, New York.

Description and history 
It consists of a two-story, three-bay-wide main structure built in about 1835, with a one-story, three-bay-wide east wing built in about 1800. The 1835 main structure is representative of the Greek Revival style. It features two elongated decorative brick chimneys and gable dormers. It is a representative example of a large, upper-income single-family dwelling along Huntington's north shore. Also located on the property are a contributing barn and shed and the Buffett family cemetery.

It was added to the National Register of Historic Places on September 26, 1985.

References

Houses on the National Register of Historic Places in New York (state)
Houses completed in 1835
Houses in Suffolk County, New York
National Register of Historic Places in Suffolk County, New York
Greek Revival houses in New York (state)